Haddadus is a genus of frogs in the family Craugastoridae. The genus has three species that are endemic to the Atlantic Forest of east and southeast Brazil. The genus is named for Célio F. B. Haddad, Brazilian herpetologist.

Description
Haddadus are small to medium-sized frogs with head narrower than body.

Species 
The genus contains three species:
 Haddadus aramunha (Cassimiro, Verdade, and Rodrigues, 2008)
 Haddadus binotatus (Spix, 1824)
 Haddadus plicifer (Boulenger, 1888)

References 

 
Craugastoridae
Endemic fauna of Brazil
Amphibian genera